The Nyquist–Shannon sampling theorem is a theorem in the field of signal processing which serves as a fundamental bridge between continuous-time signals and discrete-time signals. It establishes a sufficient condition for a sample rate that permits a discrete sequence of samples to capture all the information from a continuous-time signal of finite bandwidth.

Strictly speaking, the theorem only applies to a class of mathematical functions having a Fourier transform that is zero outside of a finite region of frequencies. Intuitively we expect that when one reduces a continuous function to a discrete sequence and interpolates back to a continuous function, the fidelity of the result depends on the density (or sample rate) of the original samples. The sampling theorem introduces the concept of a sample rate that is sufficient for perfect fidelity for the class of functions that are band-limited to a given bandwidth, such that no actual information is lost in the sampling process. It expresses the sufficient sample rate in terms of the bandwidth for the class of functions. The theorem also leads to a formula for perfectly reconstructing the original continuous-time function from the samples.

In some cases (when the sample-rate criterion is not satisfied), utilizing additional constraints allows for approximate reconstructions. The fidelity of these reconstructions can be verified and quantified utilizing Bochner's theorem.

The name Nyquist–Shannon sampling theorem honours Harry Nyquist and Claude Shannon, but the theorem was also previously discovered by E. T. Whittaker (published in 1915), and Shannon cited Whittaker's paper in his work. The theorem is thus also known by the names Whittaker–Shannon sampling theorem, Whittaker–Shannon, and Whittaker–Nyquist–Shannon, and may also be referred to as the cardinal theorem of interpolation.

Introduction
Sampling is a process of converting a signal (for example, a function of continuous time or space) into a sequence of values (a function of discrete time or space). Shannon's version of the theorem states:

A sufficient sample-rate is therefore anything larger than  samples per second. Equivalently, for a given sample rate , perfect reconstruction is guaranteed possible for a bandlimit .

When the bandlimit is too high (or there is no bandlimit), the reconstruction exhibits imperfections known as aliasing. Modern statements of the theorem are sometimes careful to explicitly state that  must contain no sinusoidal component at exactly frequency  or that  must be strictly less than ½ the sample rate. The threshold  is called the Nyquist rate and is an attribute of the continuous-time input  to be sampled. The sample rate must exceed the Nyquist rate for the samples to suffice to represent   The threshold  is called the Nyquist frequency and is an attribute of the sampling equipment. All meaningful frequency components of the properly sampled  exist below the Nyquist frequency. The condition described by these inequalities is called the Nyquist criterion, or sometimes the Raabe condition. The theorem is also applicable to functions of other domains, such as space, in the case of a digitized image.

The symbol  is customarily used to represent the interval between samples and is called the sample period or sampling interval.

A mathematically ideal way to interpolate the sequence involves the use of sinc functions. Each sample in the sequence is replaced by a sinc function, centered on the time axis at the original location of the sample  with the amplitude of the sinc function scaled to the sample value,  Subsequently, the sinc functions are summed into a continuous function. A mathematically equivalent method uses the Dirac comb and proceeds by convolving one sinc function with a series of Dirac delta pulses, weighted by the sample values. Neither method is numerically practical. Instead, some type of approximation of the sinc functions, finite in length, is used. The imperfections attributable to the approximation are known as interpolation error.

Practical digital-to-analog converters produce neither scaled and delayed sinc functions, nor ideal Dirac pulses. Instead they produce a piecewise-constant sequence of scaled and delayed rectangular pulses (the zero-order hold), usually followed by a lowpass filter (called an "anti-imaging filter") to remove spurious high-frequency replicas (images) of the original baseband signal.

Aliasing

When  is a function with a Fourier transform :

The result is:



which is a periodic function and its equivalent representation as a Fourier series, whose coefficients are  This function is also known as the discrete-time Fourier transform (DTFT) of the sample sequence.

For a band-limited function    and sufficiently large  it is possible for the copies to remain distinct from each other. But if the Nyquist criterion is not satisfied, adjacent copies overlap, and it is not possible in general to discern an unambiguous  Any frequency component above  is indistinguishable from a lower-frequency component, called an alias, associated with one of the copies. In such cases, the customary interpolation techniques produce the alias, rather than the original component. When the sample-rate is pre-determined by other considerations (such as an industry standard),  is usually filtered to reduce its high frequencies to acceptable levels before it is sampled. The type of filter required is a lowpass filter, and in this application it is called an anti-aliasing filter.

Derivation as a special case of Poisson summation

      where:

The sampling theorem is proved since  uniquely determines 

All that remains is to derive the formula for reconstruction.  need not be precisely defined in the region  because  is zero in that region. However, the worst case is when  the Nyquist frequency. A function that is sufficient for that and all less severe cases is:

where rect(•) is the rectangular function.  Therefore:

      (from  , above).
     

The inverse transform of both sides produces the Whittaker–Shannon interpolation formula:

which shows how the samples,  can be combined to reconstruct 

 Larger-than-necessary values of fs (smaller values of T), called oversampling, have no effect on the outcome of the reconstruction and have the benefit of leaving room for a transition band in which H(f) is free to take intermediate values. Undersampling, which causes aliasing, is not in general a reversible operation.
Practical digital-to-analog converters (DAC) implement an approximation like the zero-order hold. In that case, oversampling can reduce the approximation error.

Shannon's original proof
Shannon, however, only derives the series coefficients for the case . Virtually quoting Shannon's original paper:

Let  be the spectrum of   Then

because  is assumed to be zero outside the band   If we let  where  is any positive or negative integer, we obtain:

This means that the values of the samples  determine the Fourier coefficients in the series expansion of   Thus they determine  since  is zero for frequencies greater than B, and for lower frequencies  is determined if its Fourier coefficients are determined. But  determines the original function  completely, since a function is determined if its spectrum is known. Therefore the original samples determine the function  completely.

Shannon's proof of the theorem is complete at that point, but he goes on to discuss reconstruction via sinc functions, what we now call the Whittaker–Shannon interpolation formula as discussed above. He does not derive or prove the properties of the sinc function, but these would have been familiar to engineers reading his works at the time, since the Fourier pair relationship between rect (the rectangular function) and sinc was well known.

Let  be the nth sample. Then the function  is represented by:

As in the other proof, the existence of the Fourier transform of the original signal is assumed, so the proof does not say whether the sampling theorem extends to bandlimited stationary random processes.

Notes

Application to multivariable signals and images

The sampling theorem is usually formulated for functions of a single variable. Consequently, the theorem is directly applicable to time-dependent signals and is normally formulated in that context. However, the sampling theorem can be extended in a straightforward way to functions of arbitrarily many variables. Grayscale images, for example, are often represented as two-dimensional arrays (or matrices) of real numbers representing the relative intensities of pixels (picture elements) located at the intersections of row and column sample locations. As a result, images require two independent variables, or indices, to specify each pixel uniquely—one for the row, and one for the column.

Color images typically consist of a composite of three separate grayscale images, one to represent each of the three primary colors—red, green, and blue, or RGB for short. Other colorspaces using 3-vectors for colors include HSV, CIELAB, XYZ, etc. Some colorspaces such as cyan, magenta, yellow, and black (CMYK) may represent color by four dimensions. All of these are treated as vector-valued functions over a two-dimensional sampled domain.

Similar to one-dimensional discrete-time signals, images can also suffer from aliasing if the sampling resolution, or pixel density, is inadequate. For example, a digital photograph of a striped shirt with high frequencies (in other words, the distance between the stripes is small), can cause aliasing of the shirt when it is sampled by the camera's image sensor. The aliasing appears as a moiré pattern. The "solution" to higher sampling in the spatial domain for this case would be to move closer to the shirt, use a higher resolution sensor, or to optically blur the image before acquiring it with the sensor using an optical low-pass filter.

Another example is shown to the right in the brick patterns. The top image shows the effects when the sampling theorem's condition is not satisfied. When software rescales an image (the same process that creates the thumbnail shown in the lower image) it, in effect, runs the image through a low-pass filter first and then downsamples the image to result in a smaller image that does not exhibit the moiré pattern. The top image is what happens when the image is downsampled without low-pass filtering: aliasing results.

The sampling theorem applies to camera systems, where the scene and lens constitute an analog spatial signal source, and the image sensor is a spatial sampling device.  Each of these components is characterized by a modulation transfer function (MTF), representing the precise resolution (spatial bandwidth) available in that component.  Effects of aliasing or blurring can occur when the lens MTF and sensor MTF are mismatched.  When the optical image which is sampled by the sensor device contains higher spatial frequencies than the sensor, the under sampling acts as a low-pass filter to reduce or eliminate aliasing. When the area of the sampling spot (the size of the pixel sensor) is not large enough to provide sufficient spatial anti-aliasing, a separate anti-aliasing filter (optical low-pass filter) may be included in a camera system to reduce the MTF of the optical image.  Instead of requiring an optical filter, the graphics processing unit of smartphone cameras performs digital signal processing to remove aliasing with a digital filter.  Digital filters also apply sharpening to amplify the contrast from the lens at high spatial frequencies, which otherwise falls off rapidly at diffraction limits.

The sampling theorem also applies to post-processing digital images, such as to up or down sampling.  Effects of aliasing, blurring, and sharpening may be adjusted with digital filtering implemented in software, which necessarily follows the theoretical principles.

Critical frequency

With  or equivalently , the samples are given by:

. That sort of ambiguity is the reason for the strict inequality of the sampling theorem's condition.

Sampling of non-baseband signals
As discussed by Shannon:

A similar result is true if the band does not start at zero frequency but at some higher value, and can be proved by a linear translation (corresponding physically to single-sideband modulation) of the zero-frequency case. In this case the elementary pulse is obtained from sin(x)/x by single-side-band modulation.

That is, a sufficient no-loss condition for sampling signals that do not have baseband components exists that involves the width of the non-zero frequency interval as opposed to its highest frequency component. See Sampling (signal processing) for more details and examples.

For example, in order to sample the FM radio signals in the frequency range of 100–102 MHz, it is not necessary to sample at 204 MHz (twice the upper frequency), but rather it is sufficient to sample at 4 MHz (twice the width of the frequency interval).

A bandpass condition is that X(f) = 0, for all nonnegative f outside the open band of frequencies:

for some nonnegative integer N. This formulation includes the normal baseband condition as the case N=0.

The corresponding interpolation function is the impulse response of an ideal brick-wall bandpass filter (as opposed to the ideal brick-wall lowpass filter used above) with cutoffs at the upper and lower edges of the specified band, which is the difference between a pair of lowpass impulse responses:

Other generalizations, for example to signals occupying multiple non-contiguous bands, are possible as well. Even the most generalized form of the sampling theorem does not have a provably true converse. That is, one cannot conclude that information is necessarily lost just because the conditions of the sampling theorem are not satisfied; from an engineering perspective, however, it is generally safe to assume that if the sampling theorem is not satisfied then information will most likely be lost.

Nonuniform sampling
The sampling theory of Shannon can be generalized for the case of nonuniform sampling, that is, samples not taken equally spaced in time. The Shannon sampling theory for non-uniform sampling states that a band-limited signal can be perfectly reconstructed from its samples if the average sampling rate satisfies the Nyquist condition. Therefore, although uniformly spaced samples may result in easier reconstruction algorithms, it is not a necessary condition for perfect reconstruction.

The general theory for non-baseband and nonuniform samples was developed in 1967 by Henry Landau. He proved that the average sampling rate (uniform or otherwise) must be twice the occupied bandwidth of the signal, assuming it is a priori known what portion of the spectrum was occupied.
In the late 1990s, this work was partially extended to cover signals whose amount of occupied bandwidth was known, but the actual occupied portion of the spectrum was unknown. In the 2000s, a complete theory was developed
(see the section Sampling below the Nyquist rate under additional restrictions below) using compressed sensing. In particular, the theory, using signal processing language, is described in this 2009 paper. They show, among other things, that if the frequency locations are unknown, then it is necessary to sample at least at twice the Nyquist criteria; in other words, you must pay at least a factor of 2 for not knowing the location of the spectrum. Note that minimum sampling requirements do not necessarily guarantee stability.

Sampling below the Nyquist rate under additional restrictions

The Nyquist–Shannon sampling theorem provides a sufficient condition for the sampling and reconstruction of a band-limited signal. When reconstruction is done via the Whittaker–Shannon interpolation formula, the Nyquist criterion is also a necessary condition to avoid aliasing, in the sense that if samples are taken at a slower rate than twice the band limit, then there are some signals that will not be correctly reconstructed. However, if further restrictions are imposed on the signal, then the Nyquist criterion may no longer be a necessary condition.

A non-trivial example of exploiting extra assumptions about the signal is given by the recent field of compressed sensing, which allows for full reconstruction with a sub-Nyquist sampling rate. Specifically, this applies to signals that are sparse (or compressible) in some domain. As an example, compressed sensing deals with signals that may have a low over-all bandwidth (say, the effective bandwidth EB), but the frequency locations are unknown, rather than all together in a single band, so that the passband technique does not apply. In other words, the frequency spectrum is sparse. Traditionally, the necessary sampling rate is thus 2B. Using compressed sensing techniques, the signal could be perfectly reconstructed if it is sampled at a rate slightly lower than 2EB. With this approach, reconstruction is no longer given by a formula, but instead by the solution to a linear optimization program.

Another example where sub-Nyquist sampling is optimal arises under the additional constraint that the samples are quantized in an optimal manner, as in a combined system of sampling and optimal lossy compression. This setting is relevant in cases where the joint effect of sampling and quantization is to be considered, and can provide a lower bound for the minimal reconstruction error that can be attained in sampling and quantizing a random signal. For stationary Gaussian random signals, this lower bound is usually attained at a sub-Nyquist sampling rate, indicating that sub-Nyquist sampling is optimal for this signal model under optimal quantization.

Historical background
The sampling theorem was implied by the work of Harry Nyquist in 1928, in which he showed that up to 2B independent pulse samples could be sent through a system of bandwidth B; but he did not explicitly consider the problem of sampling and reconstruction of continuous signals. About the same time, Karl Küpfmüller showed a similar result and discussed the sinc-function impulse response of a band-limiting filter, via its integral, the step-response sine integral; this bandlimiting and reconstruction filter that is so central to the sampling theorem is sometimes referred to as a Küpfmüller filter (but seldom so in English).

The sampling theorem, essentially a dual of Nyquist's result, was proved by Claude E. Shannon. The mathematician E. T. Whittaker published similar results in 1915, J. M. Whittaker in 1935, and Gabor in 1946 ("Theory of communication").

In 1948 and 1949, Claude E. Shannon published the two revolutionary articles in which he founded the information theory. In Shannon 1948 the sampling theorem is formulated as “Theorem 13”: Let f(t) contain no frequencies over W. Then
 where . 
It was not until these articles were published that the theorem known as “Shannon’s sampling theorem” became common property among communication engineers, although Shannon himself writes that this is a fact which is common knowledge in the communication art.  A few lines further on, however, he adds: "but in spite of its evident importance, [it] seems not to have appeared explicitly in the literature of communication theory".

Other discoverers
Others who have independently discovered or played roles in the development of the sampling theorem have been discussed in several historical articles, for example, by Jerri and by Lüke. For example, Lüke points out that H. Raabe, an assistant to Küpfmüller, proved the theorem in his 1939 Ph.D. dissertation; the term Raabe condition came to be associated with the criterion for unambiguous representation (sampling rate greater than twice the bandwidth).  Meijering mentions several other discoverers and names in a paragraph and pair of footnotes:
As pointed out by Higgins [135], the sampling theorem should really be considered in two parts, as done above: the first stating the fact that a bandlimited function is completely determined by its samples, the second describing how to reconstruct the function using its samples. Both parts of the sampling theorem were given in a somewhat different form by J. M. Whittaker [350, 351, 353] and before him also by Ogura [241, 242]. They were probably not aware of the fact that the first part of the theorem had been stated as early as 1897 by Borel [25].27 As we have seen, Borel also used around that time what became known as the cardinal series. However, he appears not to have made the link [135]. In later years it became known that the sampling theorem had been presented before Shannon to the Russian communication community by Kotel'nikov [173]. In more implicit, verbal form, it had also been described in the German literature by Raabe [257]. Several authors [33, 205] have mentioned that Someya [296] introduced the theorem in the Japanese literature parallel to Shannon. In the English literature, Weston [347] introduced it independently of Shannon around the same time.28

27 Several authors, following Black [16], have claimed that this first part of the sampling theorem was stated even earlier by Cauchy, in a paper [41] published in 1841. However, the paper of Cauchy does not contain such a statement, as has been pointed out by Higgins [135].

28 As a consequence of the discovery of the several independent introductions of the sampling theorem, people started to refer to the theorem by including the names of the aforementioned authors, resulting in such catchphrases as “the Whittaker–Kotel’nikov–Shannon (WKS) sampling theorem" [155] or even "the Whittaker–Kotel'nikov–Raabe–Shannon–Someya sampling theorem" [33]. To avoid confusion, perhaps the best thing to do is to refer to it as the sampling theorem, "rather than trying to find a title that does justice to all claimants" [136].

Why Nyquist?
Exactly how, when, or why Harry Nyquist had his name attached to the sampling theorem remains obscure. The term Nyquist Sampling Theorem (capitalized thus) appeared as early as 1959 in a book from his former employer, Bell Labs, and appeared again in 1963, and not capitalized in 1965. It had been called the Shannon Sampling Theorem as early as 1954, but also just the sampling theorem by several other books in the early 1950s.

In 1958, Blackman and Tukey cited Nyquist's 1928 article as a reference for the sampling theorem of information theory, even though that article does not treat sampling and reconstruction of continuous signals as others did. Their glossary of terms includes these entries:
 Sampling theorem (of information theory) Nyquist's result that equi-spaced data, with two or more points per cycle of highest frequency, allows reconstruction of band-limited functions. (See Cardinal theorem.)
 Cardinal theorem (of interpolation theory) A precise statement of the conditions under which values given at a doubly infinite set of equally spaced points can be interpolated to yield a continuous band-limited function with the aid of the function 

Exactly what "Nyquist's result" they are referring to remains mysterious.

When Shannon stated and proved the sampling theorem in his 1949 article, according to Meijering, "he referred to the critical sampling interval  as the Nyquist interval corresponding to the band W, in recognition of Nyquist’s discovery of the fundamental importance of this interval in connection with telegraphy". This explains Nyquist's name on the critical interval, but not on the theorem.

Similarly, Nyquist's name was attached to Nyquist rate in 1953 by Harold S. Black:

According to the OED, this may be the origin of the term Nyquist rate. In Black's usage, it is not a sampling rate, but a signaling rate.

See also 

 44,100 Hz, a customary rate used to sample audible frequencies is based on the limits of human hearing and the sampling theorem
 Balian–Low theorem, a similar theoretical lower bound on sampling rates, but which applies to time–frequency transforms
 Cheung–Marks theorem, which specifies conditions where restoration of a signal by the sampling theorem can become ill-posed
 Shannon–Hartley theorem
 Nyquist ISI criterion
 Reconstruction from zero crossings
 Zero-order hold
 Dirac comb

Notes

References

Further reading 

 and (10): pp. 178–182

External links 

 Learning by Simulations Interactive simulation of the effects of inadequate sampling
 Interactive presentation of the sampling and reconstruction in a web-demo Institute of Telecommunications, University of Stuttgart
 Undersampling and an application of it
 Sampling Theory For Digital Audio
 Journal devoted to Sampling Theory
 
 

Digital signal processing
Information theory
Theorems in Fourier analysis
Articles containing proofs
Mathematical theorems in theoretical computer science
Claude Shannon
Telecommunication theory